Ali Abad Qajar is a village in Chahardangeh Rural District of Chahardangeh District of Eslamshahr County, Tehran province, Iran. The latest census in 2016 showed a population of 1,607 people in 469 households; it was the only populated village of the two in its rural district. Khomarabad registered a population of zero.

References 

Eslamshahr County

Populated places in Tehran Province

Populated places in Eslamshahr County